Cathedral Provincial Park and Protected Area, usually known as Cathedral Provincial Park and also as Cathedral Park, is a provincial park in British Columbia, Canada.  It is located east of E.C. Manning Provincial Park, south of BC Highway 3, and southeast of the town of Princeton and southwest of Keremeos.  Its southern boundary is the border with the United States.  Much of the park is the basin of the Ashnola River.

History

The park gets its name from Cathedral Mountain, near the international border. The peak was named in 1901 by Carl and George Smith on a United States Geological Survey expedition, who are believed to be the first to have ascended the summit. This park ran in a narrow north–south corridor along Lakeview Creek from the Ashnola River in the North to the international boundary. The park included the Cathedral Lakes area. After a lengthy consultation process with local interest groups, industry, and researchers, the park was expanded to have boundaries that roughly matched natural boundaries. On April 18, 2001, the contiguous conservation area protected was expanded with the establishment of the  Snowy Protected Area.

Recreation

The park is home to front-country vehicle accessible camping as well as back-country camping. There are multiple day-use areas in the park. Accommodation is provided within the park at the Cathedral Lakes Lodge. There are no public roads within the park itself. The park is connected to E. C. Manning Provincial Park by the Centennial Trail from Osoyoos to Simon Fraser University, though it has not been maintained recently and no longer appears on maps of Manning Park.

References

External links

BC Parks Web page
A day hike along the ridge over Glacier Lake
BCGNIS listing "Cathedral Park"

Provincial parks of British Columbia
Similkameen Country
Canadian Cascades
2001 establishments in British Columbia